The Hacker Ethic may refer to:
 Hacker ethic
 The Hacker Ethic and the Spirit of the Information Age